Sebastián Bartolini (born February 1, 1982) is an Argentine footballer who plays as a centre back.

Career
In July 2009, Bartolini signed for Greek Superleague side Asteras Tripoli. In the summer of 2014, he was released from Asteras. On 4 August 2014 Bartolini signed for Greek Football League outfit Iraklis. On 9 June 2017, the experienced Argentine central defender renewed his contract with Apollon Smyrni until the end of 2017–18 season.

References

External links
 Profile at soccernet-assets.espn.go.com

1982 births
Living people
People from Rosario Department
Argentine footballers
Argentine expatriate footballers
Association football defenders
Club Atlético Belgrano footballers
Godoy Cruz Antonio Tomba footballers
Comisión de Actividades Infantiles footballers
Talleres de Córdoba footballers
Asteras Tripolis F.C. players
Iraklis Thessaloniki F.C. players
Super League Greece players
Expatriate footballers in Greece
Aurora F.C. players
Sportspeople from Santa Fe Province